Bath is an unincorporated community in Bath Township, Franklin County, Indiana.

History
Bath, also called New Bath to differentiate itself from Old Bath, was laid out in 1903 when the railroad was extended to that point.

Geography

References

Unincorporated communities in Franklin County, Indiana
Unincorporated communities in Indiana